Ján Nosko (born 25 May 1988) is a Slovak football defender who currently plays for the 2. Liga club Dukla Banská Bystrica.

Career
He made his professional debut for Dukla Banská Bystrica against Spartak Myjava on 12 July 2013.

Between 2015 and 2019, Nosko had spent 4,5 years playing with Pohronie, collecting some 140 competitive caps and scoring 11 competitive goals. He had won the 2. Liga with the club in the 2018–19 season, winning the club's first promotion to the Fortuna Liga.

References

External links
 Corgoň Liga profile
 
 Eurofotbal profile

1988 births
Living people
Slovak footballers
Association football defenders
FK Železiarne Podbrezová players
FK Dukla Banská Bystrica players
FK Pohronie players
Slovak Super Liga players
Sportspeople from Brezno
2. Liga (Slovakia) players